The yellow-headed manakin (Chloropipo flavicapilla) is a species of bird in the family Pipridae.

It is found in Colombia and Ecuador. Its natural habitats are subtropical or tropical moist montane forest and heavily degraded former forest. It is becoming rare due to habitat loss.

References

yellow-headed manakin
Birds of the Colombian Andes
Birds of the Ecuadorian Andes
yellow-headed manakin
yellow-headed manakin
Taxonomy articles created by Polbot